Matthew Marvin may refer to:

 Matthew Marvin, Sr. (1600–1678), founding settler of Norwalk, Connecticut and deputy of the General Court of the Colony of Connecticut
 Matthew Marvin, Jr. (1626–1712), founding settler of Norwalk, Connecticut and deputy of the Connecticut General Assembly 
 Matthew Marvin (Connecticut politician),  member of the Connecticut House of Representatives from 1796 to 1799